The Union and Security Act, alternatively Act of Union and Security, was proposed by king Gustav III of Sweden to the assembled Estates of the Realm during the Riksdag of 1789. It was a document, adding to the Swedish Constitution of 1772 new provisions. The King strengthened his grip on power while at the same time riding on a popular wave that also meant a decrease in aristocratic power. It has been described as "fundamentally conservative".

Passage
During the Russo-Swedish War, in February 1789, Gustav summoned the Riksdag of the Estates and placed an Act of Union and Security before them. Three of the four estates accepted it, but the Nobles rejected it. Since three of the four Estates accepted it, it was passed and became law.

Contents
The Act of Union and Security gave the king the sole power to declare war and make peace instead of sharing the power with the estates and the Privy Council. The estates would lose the ability to initiate legislation, but they would keep the ability to vote on new taxes.

Another provision was that the King was enabled to determine the number of Privy Councillors and so he could abolish the Council altogether by determining their number to be zero. The judicial branch of the Privy Council (in ) was then transferred to a new Supreme Court.

Most noble privileges were abolished with the Act, with most offices now available to all regardless of rank. Noble lands could now be bought by anyone instead of only by nobles.

See also
 Gustav III
 Constitution of Sweden
 Constitution of Finland
 1789 Conspiracy (Sweden)

References

1789 in law
Legal history of Sweden
Legal history of Finland
1789 in Sweden
Constitution of Sweden
Defunct constitutions
Grand Duchy of Finland
Sweden during the Gustavian era
Gustav III
1789 in politics